Vihti is a small municipality located in the Uusimaa region of province of Southern Finland, approximately  northwest of the capital city Helsinki. Its seat is Nummela, which is the most populated urban area in the municipality.

Vihti's neighboring municipalities are Karkkila, Loppi, Hyvinkää, Nurmijärvi, Espoo, Kirkkonummi, Siuntio and Lohja from north to clockwise. There are several significant road connections through Vihti, the most notables being Pori Highway between Pori and Helsinki, Hanko Highway between Hanko and Hyvinkää, and Vihti Road between Vihti and Helsinki. Vihti's largest lake is Lake Hiidenvesi, which is connected to the Gulf of Finland via Lake Lohja and Karis River.

History
The oldest literal mark of Vihti is from the 15th century. The old parish church, St. Bridget's Church, was also built during this time. After the deterioration of the old church, a new current church was built in Vihti and was completed in 1772.

Politics
Results of the 2019 Finnish parliamentary election in Vihti:

Finns Party   20%
Social Democratic Party   18%
National Coalition Party   17.9%
Centre Party   14.2%
Green League   10.1%
Movement Now   5.2%
Left Alliance   4.8%
Christian Democrats   3.4%
Swedish People's Party   2.4%
Other parties   3.8%

Economy
The electronics contract manufacturer DICRO Oy is one of its main employers, along with the local forestry companies and farmers.

Villages
Haimoo, Härkälä, Jokikunta, Oinasjoki, Ojakkala, Palajärvi, Siippoo, Tervalampi, Haapkylä, Huhmari, Hulttila, Hynnölä, Härtsilä, Irjala, Jokikunta, Jättölä, Kaharla, Kaukola, Kauppila, Kirkonkylä, Kirvelä, Koikkala, Korkaniemi, Korppila, Kourla, Köykkälä, Lahnus, Lahti, Lankila, Leppärlä, Lusila, Maikkala, Merramäki, Niemenkylä, Niemi, Niuhala, Nummela, Olkkala, Ollila, Otalampi, Oravala, Pakasela, Pietilä, Pääkslahti, Ruskela, Salmi, Selki, Suksela, Suontaka, Taipale, Tarttila, Torhola, Tuohilampi, Vanhala, Vanjoki, Vanjärvi, Vesikansa, Vihti, Vihtijärvi, Vähäkylä

Friendship cities 
 Fukui Prefecture, Japan (since 1980)

References

External links

Municipality of Vihti – Official website
Vihti constructive debate Vihdin Keskustelualueet

 
Greater Helsinki
Populated places established in 1867